The Revolutionary War Door is an artwork by American sculptor Thomas Crawford, located on the United States Capitol House of Representatives wing east front in Washington, D.C., United States. This sculptured door was surveyed in 1993 as part of the Smithsonian's Save Outdoor Sculpture! program.

Description

These two elaborate doors consist of six panel medallions that depict activities and events during the American Revolution.

The left panel, top to bottom, depicts:

The Battle of Wyoming
The Battle of Lexington
The presentation of the flag and medal to Major General Nathanael Greene
The death of Major General Richard Montgomery

The right panel, top to bottom, depicts:

The public reading of the United States Declaration of Independence in Philadelphia
The Peace of Paris
George Washington's farewell to his officers in New York at Fraunces Tavern
Benjamin Franklin working in his studio

History
Crawford designed the doors in Rome between 1855 and 1857. Crawford died in 1857, leaving William H. Rinehart to create the models from Crawford's original sketches during the years of 1863–1867. The models were stored in the crypt of the Capitol until they were cast in 1904 and installed in 1905.

Crawford created a companion set of bronze doors for the House wing of the Capitol, the George Washington and the Revolutionary War Door.  

In 1993 the door was analyzed by art conservators from the Save Outdoor Sculpture! survey program and was described as well-maintained.

See also
 List of public art in Washington, D.C., Ward 6

Further reading

Allen, William C. History of the United States Capitol: A Chronicle of Design, Construction, and Politics. Architect of the Capitol, 2001. 
Wood, James M. Washington Sculpture. Johns Hopkins Press, 2008.

References

1905 establishments in Washington, D.C.
1905 sculptures
American Revolutionary War monuments and memorials
Bronze sculptures in Washington, D.C.
George Washington in art
Bronze doors
United States Capitol art
United States Declaration of Independence in art
Sculptures of men in Washington, D.C.
Cultural depictions of Benjamin Franklin